

Greece
ΤΑ ΝΕΑ ΤΟΥ ΑΝΤ1 (also branded on air as ANT1 News) is a famous news television programme in Greece, aired by ANT1 since 1989 and is currently hosted by Nikos Hadjinikolaou, as well as the rest of the ANT1 News Team.

It has previously been hosted by Terrence Quick, Dimitris Stamou, Elli Stai, Nikos Evagelatos and most recently by Maria Houkli. 

ΤΑ ΝΕΑ ΤΟΥ ΑΝΤ1 broadcasts its main evening news show at 18:45 (local time) and this runs for one hour. During 2000 through to 2001, the show started at 19:30 and ran for one and a half hour. Before 1997, it was broadcast for 30 minutes.

The main evening news on ANT1 has been number one in the Greek television ratings several times. The program is in direct competition for viewers with other private television stations, such as Mega Channel and Alter who also broadcast their main evening news shows at 20:00. Alpha TV moved their main evening news from 20:00 to 19:00 in 2009 so that they no longer compete to be number one in this time slot.

ΤΑ ΝΕΑ ΤΟΥ ΑΝΤ1 also broadcasts an afternoon edition of the program which airs at 13:00 (local time) and runs for approximately 25 minutes. There is a second shorter edition at 13:50 (local time) which lasts for approximately 10 minutes and also features the news in sign language. 

All ANT1 Greece's news broadcasts are available to watch online at www.ant1news.gr

Cyprus
In Cyprus, ΤΑ ΝΕΑ ΤΟΥ ΑΝΤ1 ΚΥΠΡΟΥ (ANT1 Cyprus News) has different reporters and begins every night at 20:15 (local time) and runs for approximately one hour. The main broadcast is also repeated during the night allowing viewers a second chance to watch.

ANT1 News in Cyprus also offers a 30-minute news program at 18:00 and a 20-minute late night news program that broadcasts at midnight local time.

ANT1 Cyprus offers viewers worldwide the opportunity to watch the midnight broadcast online at www.ant1.com.cy

See also
List of programs broadcast by ANT1

ANT1 original programming
1989 Greek television series debuts
1990s Greek television series
2000s Greek television series
2010s Greek television series
2020s Greek television series
Greek television news shows
1980s Greek television series